Três Marcos is a village in the municipality of Fazenda Nova, Goiás, Brazil. Três Marcos has a population of 134 who are able to vote in Brazil's election. Três Marcos also has a municipal school named Escola Municipal Ismael Martins Ferreira, which has the village's polling station.

References 

Geography of Goiás
Populated places in Goiás